Teratornis (Greek: "wonder" (teretos), "bird" (ornis)) was a genus of huge North American birds of prey—the best-known of the teratorns—of which, two species are known to have existed: Teratornis merriami and Teratornis woodburnensis. A large number of fossil and subfossil bones, representing more than 100 individuals, have been found in locations in California, Oregon, southern Nevada, Arizona, and Florida, though most are from the Californian La Brea Tar Pits. All remains except one Early Pleistocene partial skeleton from the Leisey Shell Pit near Charlotte Harbor, Florida (which may represent a different species or a subspecies) date from the Late Pleistocene, with the youngest remains dating from the Pleistocene–Holocene boundary.

Taxonomy

 Teratornis merriami. This is by far the best-known species. Over a hundred specimens have been found, mostly from the La Brea Tar Pits. It became extinct at the end of the Pleistocene, some 10,000 years ago. Before formation of the Teratornithidae family, The T. merriamis hooked beak and skull morphology led to its initial placement in the family Vulturidae alongside New World Vultures. Further analysis has suggested a potentially equal relation to storks in the Ciconiidae family. Despite similarities, these three families can be differentiated by their differing skulls in response to significantly different feeding methods.
 Teratornis woodburnensis. The first species to be found north of the La Brea Tar Pits, this partial specimen was discovered at Legion Park, Woodburn, Oregon in 1999. It is known from a humerus, parts of the cranium, beak, sternum, and vertebrae which indicate an estimated wingspan of over 4 meters (14 ft). The find dates to the late Pleistocene, about 12,000 years ago, in a stratum containing the remains of megafauna such as mammoth, mastodon, and ground sloths, as well as evidence of early human occupancy at the site.

Another form, "Teratornis" olsoni, was described from the Pleistocene of Cuba, but its affinities are not completely resolved; it might not be a teratorn, but has also been placed in its own genus, Oscaravis. There are also undescribed fossils from southwestern Ecuador, but apart from these forms, teratorns were restricted to North America.

A closely related genus, Aiolornis, was about 40% larger and lived at an earlier time; it was formerly known as Teratornis incredibilis, but is distinct enough to be placed in its own genus.

Description

The finger bones of the Teratornis were fused as in all modern birds; however, part of the index finger forms a shelf which aided in bearing the load of long and stout primaries, enabling the bird to utilize strong upcurrents in flight. Their legs were similar to an Andean condor's, but stouter, and the feet could hold prey for tearing off pieces, but could not exert a very forceful grip like birds of prey. Its wing loading was not much larger than a Californian condor's, and Merriam's teratorn should have been able to take off by simply jumping and beating its wings under most circumstances. Indeed, it seems to have been better adapted for utilizing a short run into the wind from an elevated location as condors do, as its legs are proportionally smaller and its stride less than in condors. Thus, Teratornis may have primarily inhabited cliff terrain, where it could take off and soar through the air easily.

Paleobiology

Diet and feeding habits 
The T. merriami was similar to condors, although an analysis of the functional morphology of its skull, namely its larger bill and ability to spread its mandibles and swallow its prey whole, suggests that it was an active and carnivorous predator rather than a scavenger. In fact, some studies of skull morphology indicated that the T.merriami were incapable of tearing pieces of flesh off of carcasses in the manner of condors. Alternative viewpoints note that many old world vultures possess large bills, and a longer bill is a common feature among scavenging raptors, as this allow them to probe deeper into large carcasses - larger than those fed upon by active-hunting raptors. Other anatomical features, such as the relatively small and sideward facing orbits and the low skull, are also consistent with a scavenging lifestyle. For the T.merriami, small prey such as frogs, lizards, young birds, and rodents were swallowed whole, while carrion would have been fed on in a manner similar to that of condors or vultures.

Locomotion 
An analysis of the Teratorn pelvic girdle and stout, columnar hind leg bones suggests that its legs had greater anteroposterior ability than those of condors, and that the birds were agile and well-suited for walking and stalking prey on the ground similarly to storks and turkeys.

On the other hand, their flight was similar to that of condors. Condors fly by means of soaring on rising up-currents, generally weak currents that are subject to sudden changes in direction or strength. Their ability to react to these changes and maintain flight has to do with their emarginated primary feathers which separate and move independently during flight, contrary to the unemarginated primary feathers of birds who dynamically soar on more reliable air currents.

Habitat 
Teratornis had legs that were too short for it to take flight by running on flat ground. It is theorized that the Teratornis primarily inhabited cliff terrain, where it could take off and soar through the air easily.

Many Teratorn bone samples contributing to modern research have been found at the La Brea Tar Pits in Los Angeles, California. Teratorns are thought to have been attracted by Pleistocene megafauna that became stuck and died in the viscous asphalt while trying to drink from pools of water that gathered on the surface, with the teratorns subsequently falling victim to the sticky deposits. Merriam's Teratorn probably played an important role in opening up the body cavities of carcasses for smaller birds like eagles and ravens which are also known to have frequented the locality, as mammalian predators-- being unable to fly-- could hardly reach most carcasses without getting mired in the asphalt themselves.

However, there were also true vultures present in the area at that time, and unlike those, T. merriami was also well adapted to hunt for smaller animals which are also known to have utilized the pools. Analysis of the skull and bill shapes suggests that fish may have constituted a major part of its diet. Taking into account the strong legs, stout claws, and a gripping power not quite as developed as in eagles, it is rather likely that Merriam's Teratorn would have hunted for aquatic prey in the manner of an osprey, which also provides a reasonable explanation of how such large numbers of powerful, well-flying birds could have become stuck in the asphalt.

References 

Bird genera
Extinct animals of the United States
Fossil taxa described in 1909
Late Quaternary prehistoric birds
Pleistocene birds of North America
Pleistocene birds
Pleistocene genus extinctions
Taxa named by Loye H. Miller
Teratornithidae